The 1967 Grantland Rice Bowl was an NCAA College Division game following the 1967 season, between the Eastern Kentucky Colonels and the Ball State Cardinals. Eastern Kentucky quarterback Jim Guice was named the game's most outstanding player.

Notable participants
Ball State tackle Oscar Lubke and guard Elie Ghattas were selected in the 1968 NFL/AFL Draft, as was Eastern Kentucky wide receiver Aaron Marsh. Ball State running back Amos Van Pelt was selected in the 1969 NFL/AFL Draft.

Eastern Kentucky head coach Roy Kidd was inducted to the College Football Hall of Fame in 2003.

Scoring summary

References

Further reading
 
 

Grantland Rice Bowl
Grantland Rice Bowl
Ball State Cardinals football bowl games
Eastern Kentucky Colonels football bowl games
Murfreesboro, Tennessee
December 1967 sports events in the United States
Grantland Rice